Tiago Barreiros de Melo Tomás (born 16 June 2002) is a Portuguese professional footballer who plays as a forward for Bundesliga club VfB Stuttgart on loan from Sporting CP.

Club career
Born in Lisbon of Angolan descent, Tomás came through the youth system of Sporting CP after a year at nearby Estoril. On 25 June 2020, he signed a five-year contract at the former club, with a buyout clause of €60 million.

Tomás made his professional debut on 1 July 2020 one month after his 18th birthday, as an 81st-minute substitute for Matheus Nunes in a 2–1 Primeira Liga win against Gil Vicente at home. He scored his first goal on 24 September, the only one of a home victory over Aberdeen in the third qualifying round of the UEFA Europa League. He contributed three goals from 30 appearances during the season, helping his team to conquer the league after 19 years.

On 30 January 2022, Tomás was loaned to VfB Stuttgart until June 2023 with a buying option. He played his first match in the Bundesliga six days later, replacing Chris Führich for the final ten minutes of the 3–2 home loss to Eintracht Frankfurt. He scored twice in his next appearance, but was unable to keep his team from a 4–2 defeat at Bayer Leverkusen.

International career
Aged 18, Tomás was selected by Portugal under-21 manager Rui Jorge for his 2021 UEFA European Championship squad. He earned his first cap in the first group stage match, starting in the 1–0 win against Croatia in Koper.

Career statistics

Honours
Sporting CP
Primeira Liga: 2020–21
Taça da Liga: 2020–21, 2021–22
Supertaça Cândido de Oliveira: 2021

References

External links

2002 births
Living people
Portuguese sportspeople of Angolan descent
Portuguese footballers
Footballers from Lisbon
Association football forwards
Primeira Liga players
Sporting CP footballers
Bundesliga players
VfB Stuttgart players
Portugal youth international footballers
Portugal under-21 international footballers
Portuguese expatriate footballers
Expatriate footballers in Germany
Portuguese expatriate sportspeople in Germany